Rexsee is a Chinese open source webapp platform that allows developers and companies to author mobile applications with web technologies, like PhoneGap. The different is Rexsee only support for developing Android-based mobile applications and open more API.

Features
The core features of Rexsee include:
Support for standards-based web technologies: HTML, CSS and Javascript
2000+ Rexsee APIs enable your accesses to the device
Support Android native views besides HTML5 UI
Amount of extensiones and enhancement to Android SDK
Build-in all pages in APK or just leave those online, support both C/S and B/S
Support all server-side languages such as Java, PHP, Python, .NET, etc.
Support all 3-party Javascript framework
Support all languages by programmatically configuration

External links
 Rexsee Web site

References

Web applications